Clark Brian Howard (born June 20, 1955) is a popular consumer expert and podcast host of The Clark Howard Show.

Life and career

Howard grew up in Atlanta, Georgia. His parents, Bernard and Joy Garson Howard, were prominent members of Atlanta's Jewish community. Howard has three children, born in 1988, 1999 and 2005. 

He had been a nationally syndicated radio host since 1989, teaching consumers ways to "save more, spend less, and avoid rip-offs." The Clark Howard Show was heard every day on more than 200 radio stations throughout North America, and aired from News/Talk WSB, WSB AM/WSBB FM in Atlanta. He is a frequent consumer expert guest on other talk, variety, and news programs.

Howard's first career was in the travel agency business. Howard attended The Westminster Schools in Atlanta before graduating from the American University in 1976 with a BA in Urban Government. He went on to receive his Master of Business Administration degree from Central Michigan University in 1977. During Jimmy Carter’s presidency at the age of 25, when the travel industry was deregulated, he founded his travel agency business. Clark’s business quickly became successful and had several branches by the time he was approached by a large financial firm to acquire his travel business. In 1987, he was forced to retire during the sale of the travel agency business he founded six years earlier. He retired to Florida for a couple of years before returning to his home state of Georgia. During his travels between Georgia and Florida, he was approached by a radio station to give guest travel advice to listeners. Not long afterwards, he began giving travel advice in guest appearances on Atlanta radio. In 1991, Howard also became a consumer affairs TV reporter for WSB-TV, the local ABC affiliate. In 1993, he founded the Consumer Action Center to have volunteers answer consumer questions off the air. Howard's website followed in 1997, and in 1998 his show went into syndication.

Howard explained on air that he was joining the Georgia State Defense Force (an unarmed, non-federal branch of the Georgia Department of Defense) following the September 11 attacks. He attended monthly training workshops around the state as part of his service, and performed medical evacuation work in New Orleans following Hurricane Katrina.

In 2009, Howard announced he was diagnosed with prostate cancer. He made it public on WSB-TV on February 18, 2009. He gave another update three months later on his website.

In August 2017, Howard escaped serious injury from a car accident. While walking across a parking lot, he spotted a car backing towards him at high speed after hearing a woman screaming. Recalling a story he read in the news, he jumped in the air to lessen the severity of the impact and thus was only grazed by the vehicle, suffering only minor pain in his neck and shoulder, but no cuts or bruises.

Media personality
From 2012 to 2013, Howard was a co-host of HLN's Evening Express, a daily news and lifestyle roundup that aired weeknights.

Several years earlier, in 2009, Howard hosted a weekend program on HLN. The format was similar to Howard's radio show, in that the host gives advice to callers and provides tips on saving money. In 2012, he became one of several anchors on the daily HLN show "Evening Express," which aired from 5–7:00pm ET. Howard has also appeared elsewhere on HLN such as on Morning Express with Robin Meade.

Howard continues to regularly appear on WSB-TV in Atlanta, which is occasionally broadcast by other Cox Television stations nationwide. His TV appearances offer consumer scam warnings and consumer tips. He is syndicated by Westwood One.

He started several civic programs in the community, such as Atlanta Volunteer Action, Volunteer Action, Inc., The Big Buddy Program, and Career Action.

With help from his listeners, Howard began teaming up with Habitat for Humanity in 1996 to build houses around the Atlanta area. The year 2010 marked the 15th-anniversary build and "Team Clark" completed its 39th house together. In 2013, he built his 50th home for Atlanta Habitat for Humanity. In 2018, Team Clark completed its 75th Habitat home.

In 2001, Howard created the WSB Radio Care-A-Thon which raises funds each July for the AFLAC Cancer and Blood Disorders Center at Children’s Healthcare of Atlanta.

Website and Consumer Action Center

Howard's website, is a consumer advocate website with financial advice provided by Clark, his team and others in the field. In 1993, Howard opened the Team Clark Consumer Action Center, a free call-in advice center for consumer questions.

Author
Howard is the author of several books on consumer tips and bargains. His most recent book: "Clark Howard's Living Large for the Long Haul: Consumer-Tested Ways to Overhaul Your Finances, Increase Your Savings, and Get Your Life Back on Track"  contains tips to help navigate the economics of life in the US. Other books include his 2011 title Living Large in Lean Times. This book features 250+ ways to "save more, spend less, and avoid rip-offs." Other books include Clark Smart Real Estate (2006), Clark Smart Parents, Clark Smart Kids (2005), Clark's Big Book of Bargains (2003) and Get Clark Smart: The Ultimate Guide to Getting Rich From America's Money-Saving Expert (2002). Howard's Get Clark Smart made it to No. 6 on The New York Times "Best Seller" list for "How-To Books." And his Big Book of Bargains made it to No. 7 and No. 11 on The New York Times "Best Seller" list for "Business Books".

Honors
In 2011, a Golden Palm Star on the Palm Springs, California, Walk of Stars was dedicated to him. In 2015, Howard was voted into the National Radio Hall of Fame, to be inducted November 5. In 2016 he was a recipient of the "Good and Faithful Servant Award" from the Peachtree Christian Hospice.

Books
 
 
 
 
 
 
 
 Each book was written with coauthor Mark Meltzer.

References

External links
 Clark Howard's website
 Clark Howard's official book site
 750 WSB Radio – Clark Howard's "home" station
 Cox Radio Syndication
 Atlanta Journal-Constitution blog site on Atlanta's radio stations.

1955 births
Living people
American talk radio hosts
American finance and investment writers
Jewish American writers
American television talk show hosts
Radio personalities from Atlanta
Television personalities from Atlanta
American University alumni
Central Michigan University alumni
Cox Radio
The Westminster Schools alumni
21st-century American Jews